Movimiento Nacional was a governing institution of Spain established by General Francisco Franco during the Spanish Civil War in 1937. During Francoist rule in Spain, it purported to be the only channel of participation in Spanish public life. It responded to a doctrine of corporatism in which only so-called "natural entities" could express themselves: families, municipalities and unions. It was abolished in 1977.

Composition
The Movimiento Nacional was primarily composed of:
The sole legal party, called Falange Española Tradicionalista y de las Juntas de Ofensiva Nacional Sindicalista (FET y de las JONS) which had been created at the beginning of the Spanish Civil War. Other parties were prohibited (the sole name of "party" was prohibited to design any type of organization).
The sole trade union organization, called Organización Sindical Española (OSE, popularly known as the Sindicato Vertical), composed of corporativist organizations which gathered employers and workers, in opposition to Marxism's class warfare.
All civil servants and any holder of some sort of public office, who were requested to swear an oath to the Principles of the National Movement.

Leadership
The National Movement was led by Francisco Franco, titled Jefe del Movimiento (English: Chief of the Movement), assisted by a "Minister-Secretary General of the Movement". The hierarchy extended itself to all of the country, with a "local chief of the movement" named in each village.

Ideology
People who strongly identified with the Movimiento Nacional were colloquially known as Falangistas or Azules ("Blues"), from the colour of the shirts worn by the Falange Militia, José Antonio Primo de Rivera's fascist organization created during the Second Spanish Republic. Camisas viejas (Old shirts) enjoyed the honour of being historical members of the Falange, compared to Camisas nuevas (New shirts), who could be accused of opportunism.

The ideology of the Movimiento Nacional was resumed by the slogan ¡Una, Grande y Libre!, which stood for the indivisibility of the Spanish state and the refusal of any regionalism or decentralization, its imperial character, both past (the defunct Spanish Empire in the Americas) and foreseen (in Africa), and its independence towards the purported "Judeo-Masonic-Marxist international conspiracy" (a personal obsession of Franco), materialized by the Soviet Union, the European democracies, the United States (until the Pact of Madrid of 1953) or the "exterior enemy" which could threatened the nation at any time, as well as towards the long list of "internal enemies", like "anti-Spanish", "reds", "separatists", "liberals", "Jews" and "Freemasons", among others, coining expressions like "judeomarxistas".

Francoist "families"
Since one-party rule was enforced in Francoist Spain, the only way of pluralism consisted in the mixture of internal "families" (Familias del Regimen) competing together inside the National Movement. These roughly included four "families" with a genealogy tracing back to the rightwing political groups in the interwar period: the Falangists (or azules, originally from the Fascist Falange Española de las JONS), with a preeminence over the FET y de las JONS, the Spanish Syndical Organization (OSE), and the "social" government areas; the traditionalists (issued from Carlism), who held a tight control over the Ministry of Justice; the monarchists (issued from Renovación Española and Acción Española), well connected to the economic elites and the military command; and the Catholics, "Catholics" in the sense of closely linked to religious entities under the Church hierarchy such as the Acción Católica or the Asociación Católica Nacional de Propagandistas (ACNP). In addition, a new family emerged in the 1950s, the technocrats, conservatives linked to the Opus Dei who embraced a businesslike approach to the administration of the State.

Franco held his power by balancing these internal rivalries, cautious not to show any favoritism to any of them nor compromise himself too much to anyone.

Fractions of those families eventually migrated to dissident stances. These included examples such as the intermittent dissent of a part of the Monarchists who vouched for an immediate coronation of Juan de Borbón as king, as well as sizeable part of the Catholic family joining by late francoism the opposition to the dictatorship subsumed within Christian democratic groups.

Minister-Secretaries General of the Movement

Electoral history

See also

 José Larrañaga Arenas
 Mottos of Francoist Spain

References

20th century in Spain
Francoist Spain
Falangism
National syndicalism
Parties of one-party systems
Political history of Spain
Popular fronts
Spanish nationalism
Fascist movements